Guilherme Haubert Sityá (born 1 April 1990), known as Guilherme, is a Brazilian professional footballer who plays as a left-back for Süper Lig club Konyaspor.

Guilherme moved to Europe at age 21 and represented sides in Romania, Germany, Poland and Turkey, after starting his career in native Brazil. In the former country, he won four domestic trophies combined with Petrolul Ploiești and FC Steaua București.

Career
On 5 June 2017, he signed a contract with Jagiellonia Białystok.

Career statistics

Club

Honours
Petrolul Ploiești
Cupa României: 2012–13
Supercupa României runner-up: 2013

Steaua București
Liga I: 2014–15
Cupa României: 2014–15
Supercupa României runner-up: 2015
Cupa Ligii: 2014–15

Jagiellonia Białystok
Polish Cup runner-up: 2018–19

Individual
Süper Lig Left Back of the Year: 2021–22

References

External links

1990 births
Living people
2. Bundesliga players
Association football defenders
Brazilian expatriate footballers
Brazilian expatriate sportspeople in Germany
Brazilian expatriate sportspeople in Poland
Brazilian expatriate sportspeople in Romania
Brazilian footballers
Bruk-Bet Termalica Nieciecza players
CS Concordia Chiajna players
Ekstraklasa players
Expatriate footballers in Germany
Expatriate footballers in Poland
Expatriate footballers in Romania
FC Petrolul Ploiești players
FC Steaua București players
Jagiellonia Białystok players
Konyaspor footballers
Liga I players
Porto Alegre Futebol Clube players
Footballers from Porto Alegre
SpVgg Greuther Fürth players